Anglesqueville-la-Bras-Long is a commune in the Seine-Maritime département of the Normandy region of northern France.

Geography

Population

Places of interest
 The church of St. Anne, dating from the thirteenth century.
 The château de Beaumont, dating from the twelfth century
 A sandstone cross, built in 1535.

See also
Communes of the Seine-Maritime department

References

Communes of Seine-Maritime